is a series of music games by Konami. Sound Voltex Booth was tested on various cities in Japan starting on August 26, 2011 until September 19, 2011. It was then released on January 18, 2012.

Sequels Sound Voltex II: Infinite Infection, Sound Voltex III: Gravity Wars, Sound Voltex IV: Heavenly Haven, Sound Voltex: Vivid Wave, and  Sound Voltex: Exceed Gear were released on June 5, 2013, November 20, 2014, December 21, 2016, February 28, 2019, and February 17, 2021 respectively. On February 17, 2021, the publisher Konami released a new version of the cabinet called  Sound Voltex: Valkyrie Model which included new features, such as a touchscreen mainly used to adjust settings; the new cabinet doesn't change the core gameplay. Sound Voltex has seen a limited release in arcades outside of Japan. An official North American release of Exceed Gear, along with the Valkyrie Model cabinet, released on June 30, 2022. A conversion of Sound Voltex III: Gravity Wars, with the subtitle Konami Game Station was released as a PC game on October 4, 2017. At late 2021, Sound Voltex (PC) is updated to Exceed Gear.

Overview

Sound Voltex has two different parts that relate to each other: Sound Voltex Booth and Sound Voltex Floor. Sound Voltex Booth is the main game, while Sound Voltex Floor is a system where in game content is created by Japanese artists and musicians. Content chosen from Sound Voltex Floor will be inserted into Sound Voltex Booth and become available in the game. An optional Generator Real Model can be installed on a cabinet to allow it to print cards.

Gameplay

Controls

Various objects, otherwise known as notes, come towards the player on the course lane, which consists of 6 columns with rails. The player is required to input corresponding commands when the object reaches the Critical Line at the bottom of the screen. The command required will differ, depending on the objects. Four white buttons in the middle of the controller are used to hit the white notes. Two additional types of input are also required: two black buttons beneath the main four buttons, and two knobs on the top right and left corners. The black buttons (known as FX buttons) are used to hit the orange notes (FX notes). These not only add an extra layer of difficulty, but also add effects to the song, similar to that of a DJ mixed song. The knobs are used to control blue and pink lasers on the screen; the player simply turns the knobs in the direction of the corresponding laser. The left knob controls a blue laser, and the right knob controls a pink laser. A blue button on the top of the controller acts as the "Start" button, also being used as an "Okay" button of sorts. On the arcade cabinet, holding the start button whilst turning the right knob will change the lane speed. Lane speed is the speed of which the notes go down (this is as of Exceed Gear, older versions may require a different command).

Rate systems
As the player hits the objects, a judgment is received–from highest to lowest: S-Critical (Valkyrie Model only), Critical, Near, and Error–depending on the timing of hitting the objects. Getting S-Critical and Critical fills the rate gauge, while Error depletes it. From SDVX II onward, Near also fills the gauge, but fills 1/4 of the amount compared to S-Critical or Critical. The player is required to fill the rate gauge a certain amount (most commonly 70%) by the time the stage ends to clear it; otherwise the play session will be over. The amount required to fill the gauge differs depending on the rate system the player is using.

Skill Analyzer
Skill Analyzer mode is a mode added in SDVX II, which can let the player test their Skill Level. The player selects a course to play which will immediately begin after selection. Each course increases in difficulty depending on the Skill Level. Each Skill Level has 3 different courses for the player to select.

There are 12 Skill Levels (in SDVX III) which are named after colors:
 Lv. 01 
 Lv. 02 
 Lv. 03 
 Lv. 04 
 Lv. 05 
 Lv. 06 
 Lv. 07 
 Lv. 08 
 Lv. 09 
 Lv. 10 
 Lv. 11 
 Lv. ∞

See also
Bemani

References

External links 
 Sound Voltex Official Website (in Japanese).
 Sound Voltex Songlist on BemaniWiki 2nd (in Japanese).
 Sound Voltex Forum on Zenius-I-vanisher.com.

2012 video games
Arcade video games
Konami franchises
Video games developed in Japan
Windows games
Bemani games
Rhythm games